Lawrence C. Provenzano (born January 25, 1955) is the eighth and current bishop of the Episcopal Diocese of Long Island.

Biography
Bishop Provenzano was born on January 25, 1955, in Brooklyn, New York, and was raised as a Roman Catholic. He graduated with a Bachelor of Science from the State University of New York at Albany in 1980 and with a Master of Divinity from Christ the King Seminary in East Aurora, New York, in 1981. He was ordained a deacon on June 11, 1981, in the Cathedral of St Patrick in Norwich, Connecticut, and priest on May 22, 1982, in the same cathedral by Bishop Daniel Patrick Reilly. In 1981 was appointed assistant of the Cathedral of St Patrick and in 1982 became assistant priest at St Paul's Church in Waterford, Connecticut.

In 1984, he joined the Episcopal Church and was received as an Episcopal deacon on December 24, 1984, and as a priest in April 1985 by Bishop George Nelson Hunt. His Roman Catholic ordination is deemed valid by the Episcopal Church and hence he was not re-ordained as a deacon and priest. He became assistant rector of Christ Church in Westerly, Rhode Island, and in 1987 he became rector of St John's Church in North Adams, Massachusetts. Between 1995 and 2009 he was rector, of St Andrew's Church in Longmeadow, Massachusetts.

He was elected Coadjutor Bishop of Long Island on March 21, 2009, on the second ballot out of six other nominees.. He was consecrated as a bishop on September 19, 2009, took office on November 14, and installed in the cathedral on November 22.

See also
List of Episcopal bishops of the United States
Historical list of the Episcopal bishops of the United States

References

1955 births
Living people
Converts to Anglicanism from Roman Catholicism
People from Brooklyn
University at Albany, SUNY alumni
Episcopal bishops of Long Island